Badvel Assembly constituency is a SC (Scheduled Caste) reserved constituency of the Andhra Pradesh Legislative Assembly, India. It is one among 7 constituencies in the Kadapa district.

Gunthoti Venkata Subbaiah of YSR Congress Party represented the constituency as MLA from 23 May 2019 to 28 March 2021, until his death.

Overview 
It is part of the Kadapa Lok Sabha constituency along with another six Vidhan Sabha segments, namely, Kadapa, Pulivendla, Kamalapuram, Jammalamadugu, Proddatur and Mydukur in YSR Kadapa district.

Mandals

Members of Legislative assembly

Election results

1952

2004

2009

2014

2019

2021 By-election 
The death of sitting MLA Gunthoti Venkata Subbaiah necessitated the by-election for the Badvel assembly. The Election Commission of India announced that an election would take place on 28 September 2021.

Sitting party YSRCP decided to field Gunthoti Venkata Subbaiah's wife, Dr. Dasari Sudha.

Results were declared on November 2. Dr. Dasari Sudha of YSRCP won the election with a majority of 90,089 votes.

See also 
 List of constituencies of Andhra Pradesh Legislative Assembly

References 

Assembly constituencies of Andhra Pradesh
Politics of Andhra Pradesh